Wulf Steinmann (12 July 1930 – 3 January 2019) was a German physicist and former president of the Ludwig Maximilian University of Munich.

References

1930 births
2019 deaths
20th-century German physicists
Academic staff of the Ludwig Maximilian University of Munich